Traffic is a monthly, peer-reviewed, scientific journal, which was established in 2000, and is published by Wiley-Blackwell. The online version is at the Wiley Online Library. This journal is co-edited by Eric Chevet, Antonella De Matteis, Eeva-Liisa Eskelinen, and Hesso Farhan. The journal covers all aspects of signal transduction (intracellular transport) in health and disease, for both mammalian and non-mammalian biological systems.

History
The journal was established by Frances Brodsky, Mark Marsh, Sandra Schmid, and Thomas Kreis. Kreis died in a plane crash before the first issue was published.

Abstracting and indexing
This journal is abstracted and indexed in:

According to the Journal Citation Reports, the journal has a 2020 impact factor of 6.215.

References

External links

English-language journals
Wiley-Blackwell academic journals
Molecular and cellular biology journals
Publications established in 2000
Monthly journals